Red Aces is a British silent crime film of 1929 directed by Edgar Wallace and starring Janice Adair, Muriel Angelus and Nigel Bruce. It was adapted by Wallace from one of his own novels, Red Aces (1929), featuring the character of J.G. Reeder. It was shot at Beaconsfield Studios where Wallace had established a company British Lion Films to film versions of his works.

Cast
 Janice Adair as Margot Lynn 
 Muriel Angelus as Ena Burslem 
 Geoffrey Gwyther as Kenneth McKay 
 James Raglan as Rufus Machfield 
 Nigel Bruce as Kinsfeather, T.B. 
 George Bellamy as Reeder - J.G. 
 W. Cronin Wilson as Walter Wentworth 
 Douglas Payne as Insp. Gaylor 
 Carol Reed as Minor role

References

Bibliography
 Mayer, Geoff. Historical Dictionary of Crime Films. Scarecrow Press, 2012.
Ken Wlaschin, Silent Mystery and Detective Movies: A Comprehensive Filmography (2009), p. 189

External links

1930 films
British crime films
British silent feature films
1930 crime films
Films based on works by Edgar Wallace
Films shot at Beaconsfield Studios
British Lion Films films
British black-and-white films
1930s English-language films
1930s British films